Negrele may refer to:
Negrele River, Romania
Oșești, a commune in Vaslui County, Romania